TezJet Airlines is a domestic airline from Kyrgyzstan. It was founded on 23 April 2013 and commenced operations in August 2014 after receiving its first aircraft (BAe 146 bearing registration EX-27002 from Avia Traffic Company). The airline has its main hub at Manas International Airport and its fleet comprises two BAe 146 and one McDonnell Douglas MD-83 aircraft.

Destinations
As of July 2021, TezJet Airlines operates scheduled passenger flights to the following destinations:

Fleet

The airline fleet includes the following aircraft (as of July 2021):

Incidents and accidents
At 14:52 local time on 1 March 2018, flight from Bishkek to Batken had to perform an emergency landing at Bishkek airport after one of the left engines on BAe 146 aircraft broke down. The flight had taken off at 14:22 local time with 96 passengers on board. There were no fatalities or injuries due to the incident.

See also
 List of airlines of Kyrgyzstan

References 

Airlines of Kyrgyzstan
Airlines established in 2013
Airlines banned in the European Union
2013 establishments in Kyrgyzstan